Mike Sergio Terranova (born 17 November 1976) is an Italo-German former professional footballer who played as a striker. He is the manager of Rot-Weiß Oberhausen.

References

1976 births
Living people
Italian footballers
Association football forwards
2. Bundesliga players
3. Liga players
SG Wattenscheid 09 players
FC Gütersloh 2000 players
Eintracht Nordhorn players
Wuppertaler SV players
Rot-Weiß Oberhausen players
Italian football managers
Rot-Weiß Oberhausen managers